The Lungșoara is a right tributary of the river Cibin in Romania. It discharges into the Cibin in Tălmaciu.

References

Rivers of Romania
Rivers of Sibiu County